Gausón was a semi-legendary Astur general who fought the Romans in the Astur-Cantabrian Wars (29 BC–19 BC).

Little is known about Gausón due to the lack of classical sources, but historical codexes, oral tradition and other several sources do mention his presence in the Cantabrian Wars as a military leader of the Astur armies who attacked the Roman legions near the town of Lancia during the Bellum Asturicum campaign.

Historical sources
The Gran Enciclopedia Asturiana (Great Asturian Encyclopedia ) says:

However, the most part of the above references to Gausón seem to be sourced in the chronicle of the relevant historian priest Luis Alfonso de Carvallo (1571–1635), which was based on previous ecclesiastical and historical codexes and works, some of them now lost:

This chronicle thus agrees with the Florian official Roman chronicle :

In a similar way, Luis Alfonso de Carvallo continues:

References
Florus: "Epitome of Roman Wars. XXXIII. Bellum Cantabricum et Asturicum." 
Orosius: "History against the Pagans".
Dio Cassius: "Roman History".
Luis Alfonso de Carvallo: "Historia de las Antigüedades y cosas memorables del Principado de Asturias. (History of the Antiquity and memorable things of the Principality of Asturias)".   1613. Part I. Chapter IV. (Volume at the Spanish National Library).
Historia de Asturias. (Volume I: Prehistory and Ancient History.) La Nueva España 1990.
Gran Enciclopedia Asturiana.

External links
 Essay about Gausón
 Who was Gausón?

History of Asturias
Spanish generals
Roman conquest of the Iberian Peninsula
1st-century BC people